Phoenix: The Best of InMe is a greatest hits collection put together from the British band InMe's first four albums spanning 8 years from 2002 to 2010. It was released on 27 September 2010.

Background
On their "All Terrain Armada" tour in May/June 2010, InMe frontman Dave McPherson stated both on stage and in interviews conducted on the tour that the band had started learning older material from their first two albums (Overgrown Eden and White Butterfly) to support a 'best of' release which would follow in the winter.

It later emerged that the best of would contain three songs from each of InMe's four studio albums (2003's Overgrown Eden, 2005's White Butterfly, 2007's Daydream Anonymous, and 2009's Herald Moth) as well as three new tracks. These new songs will be the first to feature new lead guitarist Gazz Marlow in a full band environment.

The track list was revealed on 19 July 2010 and it was released on 27 September 2010.

Musical style
The album will span InMe's entire career and vast variety of soundscapes. Earlier material showcased on the compilation such as "Crushed Like Fruit" and "Safe In A Room" has a grunge like bounce to it whilst maintaining mainstream pop sensibility, whereas songs from Daydream Anonymous bear a more technical yet melodic metal influence on InMe's catchy rock songs. Material from 2009's Herald Moth further exacerbates InMe's heavy technical sound as well as their softer, heartfelt side, with the three new songs ("Saccharine Arcadia", "Bury Me Deep Within Your Skin" and "Thanks For Believing Me") taking both of these aspects to even further extremes.

Supporting Tour
In order to promote Phoenix, InMe  played each of their current 4 studio albums in their entirety on consecutive weekends in November/December at The Relentless Garage in London. In addition to this, the band played one warm up show for each album the night before each London show in a different city. Overgrown Eden was performed in Sheffield, White Butterfly in Manchester, Daydream Anonymous in Cardiff and Herald Moth in Leicester.

Track listing
All songs arranged by Dave McPherson. Music by InMe.

 "Safe in a Room" – from 2005's White Butterfly
 "Nova Armada" – from 2009's Herald Moth
 "Myths & Photographs" – from 2007's Daydream Anonymous
 "Underdose" – from 2003's Overgrown Eden
 "Bury Me Deep Beneath Your Skin" – recorded in 2010 for Phoenix
 "All Terrain Vehicle" – from 2009's Herald Moth
 "Cracking the Whip" – from 2007's Daydream Anonymous
 "Firefly" – from 2003's Overgrown Eden
 "Thanks for Believing Me" – recorded in 2010 for Phoenix
 "Single of the Weak" – from 2009's Herald Moth
 "Crushed Like Fruit" – from 2003's Overgrown Eden
 "Thanks for Leaving Me" – from 2007's Daydream Anonymous
 "Faster the Chase" – from 2005's White Butterfly
 "Chamber" – from 2005's White Butterfly
 "Saccharine Arcadia" – recorded in 2010 for Phoenix
 "Daydream Anonymous" (acoustic) * – recorded in 2010 for Phoenix
 "Master Storm" (acoustic) * – recorded in 2010 for Phoenix

* iTunes download-only bonus track

Personnel

Line up at time of release
 Dave McPherson – vocals, guitar on tracks 1–15.
 Gazz Marlow – lead guitar on tracks 5, 9 and 15–17
 Greg McPherson – bass guitar on tracks 2–3,5–7,9–10,12 and 15
 Simon Taylor – drums, percussion on tracks 1–15.

Other members
 Ben Konstantinovic – lead guitar on tracks 2,6 and 10.
 Joe Morgan – bass guitar on tracks 1,4,8,11,13 and 14.

InMe albums
2010 greatest hits albums